Fjölvar is a being in Norse mythology, possibly a jötunn, with whom Odin spends time fighting and seducing women with on the island of Algrœn ("All-green").

Name 
Fjölvar is an Old Norse name still used today; it was used in Old Norse as an adjective meaning 'very wary, very cautious'.

Attestation 
Fjölvar is only attested once in Hárbardsljód (The lay of Hárbarð), which tells of Hárbarð (the god Odin in disguise) spending time with Fjölvar on the island of Algrœn ("All-green").

This episode was recounted by Odin himself who alone slept with seven sisters on Algrœn in the poem Hárbardsljód (18), written in the 13th century and included in the Poetic Edda.

Theories 
According to scholar John Lindow, since the þulur list Fjölvör among the jötnar, it is likely that Fjölvar would have been her male counterpart, and therefore also a jötunn.

References

Bibliography

Further reading 

 
 Bellows, H.A. (2004) The Poetic Edda. The Mythological Poems. Courier Dover Publications.
 Thorpe, B. (1866) The Edda of Saemund the Learned., transcribed by A. Odhinnsen.
 Nordisk Mytologi; Historiska Media och Katarina Harrison Lindbergh 2017.

Jötnar